Tirupattur (194) is a state assembly constituency in Sivaganga district in Tamil Nadu. It is one of the 234 State Legislative Assembly Constituencies in Tamil Nadu, in India. Elections and winners in the constituency are listed below. Elections were not held in year 1957 and 1962.
Most successful party: DMK (8 times).

Madras State

Tamil Nadu

Election results

2021

2016

2011

2006

2001

1996

1991

1989

1984

1980

1977

1971

1967

1952

References 

Assembly constituencies of Tamil Nadu
Sivaganga district